Tetramethylsuccinonitrile or TMSN is an organic compound with the formula (C(CH3)2CN)2, classified as a dinitrile. It is a colorless and odorless solid. TMSN is the byproduct from the use of some radical initiators used in polymer manufacture.

TMSN is derived from 2,2'-azobis-isobutyronitrile:
(NC(CH3)2CN)2 → (C(CH3)2CN)2 + N2

AIBN is a common radical initiator in the manufacture of polyvinyl chloride polymers.

Safety considerations
Because PVC is pervasive and can contain TMSN, the safety aspects of this dinitrile has generated interest.

Symptoms of large or short exposure to this substance include convulsions, dizziness, headache, nausea, vomiting or even unconsciousness, hence affects central nervous system.

In regards to occupational exposures, the Occupational Safety and Health Administration and the National Institute for Occupational Safety and Health have set limits for dermal exposure at 3 mg/m3 over an eight-hour time-weighted average.

References

Alkanedinitriles